San Leonardo (or also) is a comune (municipality) in the Italian region Friuli-Venezia Giulia, located about  northwest of Trieste and about  east of Udine, and borders the following municipalities: Grimacco, San Pietro al Natisone, Savogna, Stregna, and Prepotto.

San Leonardo localities include: Altana-Utana, Camugna-Kamunja, Cemur-Čemur, Cernizza-Čarnica, Cisgne-Čišnje, Clastra-Hlastra, Cosizza-Kosca, Cravero-Kravar, Crostù-Hrastovije, Dolegna-Dolenjane, Grobbia-Grobje, Iainich-Jagnjed, Iesizza-Jesičje, Iessegna-Jesenje, Merso di Sopra-Gorenja Miersa, Merso di Sotto-Dolenja Miersa, Osgnetto-Ošnije, Ovizza-Ovica, Picig-Pičič, Picon-Pikon, Podcravero-Podkravar, Postacco-Puostak,  Precot-Prehod, Scrutto-Škrutove, Seuza-Seucè, Ussivizza-Ušiuca, Zabrida-Zabardo, Zamir-Zamier.Municipal hall is located in Merso di Sopra.

Ethnic composition

89.2% of the population in San Leonardo were Slovenes according to the census 1971.

People
 Edi Bucovaz, founder of the Slovene popular music band Beneški fantje 
 Luigi Faidutti, political leader of the Friulians in the Austro-Hungarian Monarchy

See also
Venetian Slovenia
Friuli
Slovene Lands

References

Cities and towns in Friuli-Venezia Giulia